Calmodulin-regulated spectrin-associated protein family member 3 (CAMSAP3) is a human protein encoded by the gene CAMSAP3. The protein is commonly referred to as Nezha.

Function 
CAMSAP3 acts as a minus-end anchor of microtubules, and binds to them through its CKK domain. 

In epithelial cells, it anchors microtubules to the apical cortex, causing them to grow in an apical-to-basal direction. This gives the epithelial cells their rectangular shape.

In early mouse embryogenesis, the interphase bridge linking sister cells is enriched with CAMSAP3.

References